NGC 3059 is a barred spiral galaxy. It is located in the constellation of Carina. The galaxy can be described as being faint, large, and irregularly round. It was discovered on February 22, 1835, by John Herschel. The galaxy has been calculated to be 45 - 50 million lightyears from Earth.

References

External links
NGC 3059 - Galaxy - SKY-MAP
NGC 3059 - DeepSkyPedia :: Astronomy
The kinematics of the barred spiral galaxy NGC3059* - Harvard.edu

3059
Carina (constellation)
18350222
Barred spiral galaxies
028298